The America First Party is the name of two US political parties:

America First Party (1943), an isolationist political party founded in 1943
America First Party, another name for the Populist Party (United States, 1984)

See also
America First Committee